Gobibatyr is a genus of moths in the family Cossidae.

Species
 Gobibatyr colossus (Staudinger, 1887)
 Gobibatyr ustyuzhanini Yakovlev, 2004

References

 , 2004: Carpenter-Moths (Lepidoptera: Cossidae) of Mongolia. Euroasian Entomological Journal 3 (3): 217–224. Full article: .

External links
Natural History Museum Lepidoptera generic names catalog

Cossinae
Moth genera